Mundial ('worldwide' or colloquially 'world cup' in several languages) may refer to:

 FIFA World Cup, an international men's association football competition 
 Mundial (album), by Daddy Yankee, 2010
 Mundial (magazine), a former Peruvian weekly magazine
 Mundial S.A., a Brazilian manufacturing company

See also

 World IBJJF Jiu-Jitsu Championship, commonly known as the Worlds or Mundials
 World tango dance tournament, or Mundial de Tango
 Mi mundial, a book by Daniel Baldi, and a film based on the book